Khasian may refer to:

Kasian (disambiguation)
Khasian languages